Kenneth Martin is a justice with the Supreme Court of Western Australia. He is a former editor of the West Australian Law Reports.

References

Judges of the Supreme Court of Western Australia
Living people
Year of birth missing (living people)
Place of birth missing (living people)
21st-century Australian judges